The Climate of Illinois describes the weather conditions, and extremes, noted within the state of Illinois, United States, over time.

Because of its nearly  length and mid-continental location, Illinois has a widely varying climate. Most of Illinois has a humid continental climate (Köppen climate classification Dfa) with hot, humid summers and cool to cold winters. The southernmost part of the state, from about Carbondale southward, and the eastern suburbs of St. Louis, has a humid subtropical climate (Köppen Cfa) with more moderate winters.

Illinois averages around 50 days of thunderstorm activity a year which put it somewhat above average for number of thunderstorm days for the United States. Illinois is vulnerable to tornadoes with an average of 54 occurring annually, which puts much of the state at around 9.7 tornadoes per  annually. The deadliest tornado on record in the nation occurred largely in Illinois. The Tri-State Tornado of 1925 killed 695 people in three states; 613 of the victims lived in Illinois.

Temperatures

Due to the urban heat island effect, cities tend to be  warmer on average, which is most noticeable overnight.

Heat
The most deadly heatwave in the history of the United States struck Illinois during July 1936, which killed 2,656 people.

Cold

Extreme temperatures changes can occur within minutes with the passage of a strong cold front through the state. On December 20, 1836, temperatures fell  in minutes, which supposedly froze people to their saddles and chickens in their tracks. However, Illinois did not officially recognize this measurement, as it was made from a small airport and there were no quality control procedures applied to the measurement. As a result, the official record-lowest temperature for the state was  recorded at Congerville on 5 January 1999. In 2019, the January North American Cold Wave struck Illinois. This resulted in a new record low temperature, recorded on January 31, 2019, at Mount Carroll.

Precipitation
May and June are the wettest months of the year. Flooding is the most damaging weather hazard within the state. Increased warming within urban heat islands leads to an increase in rainfall downwind of cities. Lake Michigan leads to an increase in winter precipitation along its south shore due to lake effect snow forming over the relatively warm lakes. In summer, the relatively cooler lake leads to a more stable atmosphere near the lake shore, reducing rainfall potential.

Snowstorms
The snowiest winter on record for Chicago was  during the winter of 1978–79. The city has also recorded two other winters with snowfall in excess of —1977-78 and 2013-14. Storms exceeding the normal winter value are possible within one day mainly in the southern half of the state. The heaviest snowfall recorded in Chicago history was  during the Blizzard of 1967.

Thunderstorms and severe weather
Illinois averages around 50 days of thunderstorm activity a year which put it somewhat above average for the number of thunderstorm days for the United States. Thunderstorms contribute over half of the annual precipitation statewide. Illinois is vulnerable to tornadoes with an average of 35 occurring annually, which puts much of the state at around 5 tornadoes per  annually. Peak tornado activity occurs between April and June. Illinois also receives the remnants of tropical cyclones which have struck the Gulf coast.

See also
Climate change in Illinois
Cold wave
Heat wave
List of wettest known tropical cyclone remnants in Illinois
List of ecoregions in Illinois

References
22. https://www.ncdc.noaa.gov/extremes/scec/records/IL

 
Illinois